Antonio Carro Martínez (3 May 1923 – 10 April 2020) was a Spanish politician. He was in the Minister of the Presidency for Francisco Franco's 5th and final government.

References

1923 births
2020 deaths
Spanish politicians